The Groninger  or Groningen is a Dutch horse breed developed for light draft and agricultural work. It is closely related to heavy warmblood breeds like the East Friesian and Alt-Oldenburger. The breed was nearly lost in the mid-20th century because a significant number of mares were used for crossbreeding to create the Dutch Warmblood, leaving few purebreds.

History

Foundation
The Groninger shares much of its initial foundation with the Friesian, East Friesian and Alt-Oldenburger, and Holsteiner: small native farm horses and medieval destriers were influenced by popular Spanish, Neapolitan, and Arabian horses in the 17th and 18th centuries. Horses like England's Cleveland Bay were also utilized, producing a horse that was tall by the standards of the day, as well as reasonably elegant with deep, wide haunches and a thick, high-set neck.

Although selection procedures had been in use for many years, the first Dutch horse registries weren't founded until the late 19th and early 20th centuries. The North-Netherlands Warmblood Horse Studbook, or NWP, regulated horse breeding in Groningen, Friesland, and Drenthe, while the NSTg did the same for the southern regions, including Gelderland. The goals of the registries were characterized by distinct differences in the soil composition: Groningen had heavy, wet, clay soil and needed a particularly stout horse to till it, while the soil in Gelderland was sandier.

Nevertheless, both studbooks aimed to produce a horse that could perform farm work, retaining as much elegance as possible to make them attractive carriage horses. This goal echoed that of neighboring East Frisia and Oldenburg, regions with which breeding stock were freely exchanged. The NWP also utilized Holsteiners, which were rumored to have been influenced by the horses of Dutch immigrants. In reality, all parts of the region known as Frisia have ties beyond the similarity of their soil and weather.

The result of these exchanges was that at the turn of the century, the Groninger, East Friesian, Oldenburger, and Holsteiner were calm, substantial farm and carriage horses with primarily dark coats.

In the 1920s and 30's, horses were bred to be rather heavier, fulfilling the roles of tractor horse and artillery horse, though the lighter Karossier type was still present in all populations.

Decline
Following the wars, the breeding of heavy agricultural horses collapsed, and the breeders had to adapt. In 1964, the southern studbook opened a "Sportregister" with the aim of producing riding horses, and in 1969 the NWP and southern studbook merged to form the KWPN, the Royal Warmblood Horse Studbook of the Netherlands. There was a studbook for riding horses, a studbook for driving horses, and a studbook for Gelderlanders. All of the Groninger stallions lost their breeding approval, and mare owners were encouraged to breed them to foreign stallions. The breed was sure to disappear.

Preservation
In 1978, the last remaining NWP Groninger stallion, Baldewijn, was saved from the butcher. A small group of interested breeders pooled their genetic resources - 20 mares and Baldewijn - and in 1982 formed a private association. In 1985 this association, called simply "The Groningen Horse", was recognized by Royal Decree and by the European Union 10 years later.

Alt-Oldenburg/East Friesian, Silesian, East-German, and Holsteiner horses of the appropriate type were used to re-establish the Groninger, as well as one Cleveland Bay stallion.
Today there are 25 approved stallions and over 400 mares.

Characteristics
The breed standard calls for a correct horse; heavy, with the legs about half the horse's height, and a rectangular frame, with the body from point-of-shoulder to point-of-buttock about 10% greater than the height of the horse at the withers. The topline is level, muscular neck set on fairly high, and the loins and haunches are broad and powerful. The head is workman-like and the hooves large and sound. Ideal height is between 15.3 and 16.1 hands high at the withers.

In motion, the walk is diligent with a long stride, the trot is brisk and economical with some action, and the canter is of sufficient quality. The canter was not of great importance to the breeders, who did not have need for a heavy galloping horse, and so this gait is not as strong or expressive as the trot.

The horses are known for their even temperaments, though they are seldom spiritless. They are described as "sober" with a tremendous work ethic.
Dark colors predominate: almost 90% are black or some shade of bay. A small percentage are chestnut or grey, and there are strains known for the sabino or tobiano pattern though minimally-marked horses are favored. Photographs and records show that silver dapple coloring was present as well, though it is not known if any examples of this color have survived to modern day.

The Groninger is typically shown in a white bridle without a cavesson, traditionally braided with contrasting white and green ribbons. Fillies are named as the breeder desires, while colts are named patrilineally (e.g. Batavier by Bazalt).

Uses
The Groninger is, above all "a family horse". Their calm nature and low-maintenance constitutions make them ideal horses for leisure. They are quick to mature, sound, long-lived and easy keepers, and do not need to be worked every day to be enjoyed.

Some, including approved stallions, compete in dressage at the Dutch national Z-level (about USDF 4th level) or higher, and some compete in show jumping above 4 feet as well, though this is less common.
They have found their modern niche as combined driving horses, a sport in which many, including the stallion Meinhold, compete internationally.

Medical issues
The greatest concern for the breed is inbreeding. As in other warmblood registries, stallions must undergo a veterinary examination before they are allowed to breed. In consequence, the breed is sound, long-lived, and thrifty.

References

External links
The Groningen Horse Association
dkimages gallery
Video, Groninger horses in a driving class
Videos (flash, under "K"), modern Groninger in motion

Horse breeds originating in the Netherlands
Horse breeds